

Phylogeny
The currently accepted taxonomy is based on the List of Prokaryotic names with Standing in Nomenclature (LPSN). The phylogeny is based on whole-genome analysis.

Kaistia is a genus of bacteria from the order of Hyphomicrobiales.

References

Further reading 
 
 
 

Hyphomicrobiales
Bacteria genera